The Israeli Association for International Studies (IAIS) is an independent and apolitical association, which encompasses academic staff, researchers, practitioners and research students from Israeli higher education institutions. The IAIS was established to promote and engage with the issues relating to teaching and researching in the field of international studies, as well as to strengthen the dialogue between academia and the policy and security communities in Israel.

The Annual Convention
The association conducts an annual convention, which provides a meeting point for researchers and practitioners. The annual convention consists of panels of local and international experts, across a large array of subject matter. Prizes and awards are announced during the convention. Moreover, young researchers are given the opportunity to present their research in a variety of forums.  The goal of the convention is to promote the future of international studies in Israel. The annual convention's key event is 'the state of the discipline', which analyzes the main research trends in the field.

Prizes and awards
Best Paper Award- In the annual convention an award in memory of Dr. Gil Friedman is given to the best MA or PhD paper in the field of international studies, broadly defined.
Best Doctorate Award- In the annual convention an award in memory of Prof. Yaakov Bar Siman-Tov is given to the best paper in the sub-fields of Conflict Resolution and Peace Studies.
Lifetime Achievement Award -  In the annual convention a Lifetime Achievement Award is given to a scholar or practitioner for a lifetime contribution to the field of international studies in Israel and the world.
The Award for Outstanding Service in the Field of International Studies in Israel - In the annual convention an award is given to a decision maker, a journalist or practitioner for promoting the practice and awareness in the field of international studies in Israel.

President, Staff and Board of Directors (since June 2021)
President: Prof. Sharon Pardo, Ben-Gurion University of the Negev.

Secretary-General: Dr. Hila Zahavi, Ben-Gurion University of the Negev/ The Open University.

Board of Directors: Dr. Efrat Asif, Interdisciplinary Center (IDC) Herzliya; Dr. Amir Lupovici, Tel Aviv University; Dr. Sara Kahn-Nisser, The Open University; Dr. Chen Kertcher, Ariel University; Dr. Arie Krampf, Tel Aviv-Yafo College; Dr. Daniel Sobelman, Hebrew University of Jerusalem; Dr. Eitan Shamir, Bar Ilan University.

Audit Committee: Dr. Ariel Kabiri, Western Galilee College; Dr. Carmela Lutmar, University of Haifa.

External links
 The Israeli Association for International Studies (IAIS) site

Professional associations based in Israel